is a bass guitarist and member of the rock band Okamoto's from Tokyo. He is represented with the agency Sony Music Artists. He is the eldest son of Downtown's Masatoshi Hamada and actress Natsumi Ogawa.

Equipment used
Fender Precision Bass made in 1968.
Paddle peg which was adopted for only a few years from 66 years onboard.
American Shawstar AS-57
Made in the 1990s, the shield jack part glows like a tail lamp of an American car.
Honey JET68-B
Has an inspired inspiration from Echo rocket base
Fender Precision Bass Hama Okamoto Model #4
Fender Squier Katana made in 1985

Related bands
Okamoto's
Zutto Zuletellz
EdBUS

Participating recordings
 2009

 2010

 2011

 2012

 2013

 2014

 2015

 2016

 2017

Productions

Live support
Yo-King
Hiroshi Fujiwara
Magokoro Brothers
Shigeru Suzuki×Ino Hidefumi
Gen Hoshino
The Bawdies
Tamio Okuda
Kayoko Yoshizawa

Filmography

TV programmes

Radio programmes

Others

References

External links 

 
 
 

Japanese rock bass guitarists
Musicians from Tokyo
1991 births
Living people
21st-century bass guitarists